The 2015–16 I-League 2nd Division Final Round was the final round of 2015–16 I-League 2nd Division. Three teams each from Eastern Conference and Western Conference played in the final round. Dempo were the winner of the tournament, however in spite of earning the promotion, they withdrew from 2016–17 I-League.

Teams

The following teams have qualified for the final round:

Table

Result table

See also
 2015–16 I-League
 2015–16 I-League 2nd Division
 2015–16 I-League U18 Final Round

References

External links
 Official website

I-League 2nd Division final rounds
I-League 2nd Division